Nemateleotris is a genus of dartfishes native to the Indian and Pacific oceans.

Species
There are currently four recognized species in this genus:
 Nemateleotris decora J. E. Randall & G. R. Allen, 1973 (Elegant firefish)
 Nemateleotris exquisita J. E. Randall & Connell, 2013
 Nemateleotris helfrichi J. E. Randall & G. R. Allen, 1973 (Helfrichs' dartfish)
 Nemateleotris magnifica Fowler, 1938 (Fire goby)

References

 
Microdesmidae
Gobiidae
Gobiiformes
Taxa named by Henry Weed Fowler